Here Come the Girls was a co-headlining concert tour by American recording artists Anastacia and Chaka Khan and Scottish recording artist Lulu. The tour, primarily reaching Europe, began in November 2009. Described as a music extravaganza that mixes high octane, high camp, get up and dance songs, against a backdrop of glamour and fun, the trek became a hit, selling out all 20 dates in 2009. Due to demand, the tour continued into 2010, with English singer Heather Small replacing Chaka Khan.
The tour became praised by both critics and spectators alike. At the time, concert promoters speculated about a 2011 extension of the tour into Continental Europe and North America.

The show consisted mostly of covering songs because (collectively) the girls wanted to sing the music that inspired them versus singing only original material. The singers did solo selections but sang a majority of the songs as a trio.

Singer Anastacia described the show as,"[...] an amazing, fun party like atmosphere!!! We want everyone standing, dancing and singing along!!! We are sure to make you laugh lots and may even draw a tear or two." To promote the tour, the girls appeared on Good Morning Television, BBC Breakfast, Loose Women, Afternoon Live with Kay Burley, London Tonight and Live from Studio Five. Additionally they opened the Royal Variety Performance at the Opera House Theatre, Blackpool with a performance of "Relight My Fire".

Setlist

Tour dates

Cancellations and rescheduled shows

Box office

Critical reception
The tour received high praise from spectators of the performance by the girls, however, music critics gave the tour mixed reviews.

Stephen Dalton (The Times) gave the performance at Colston Hall  three out of five stars remarking, "Familiar fare or not, there is no substitute for the rowdy excitement of hearing evergreen anthems belted out by a great singer — or three great singers, in this case. At 61, Lulu's gravelled growl can still level entire Glaswegian tenement blocks, while 56-year-old Chaka's voluptuous contralto makes your ears feel as if they are drowning in warm treacle. Vocally, the 41-year-old Anastacia is the blandest, but she still packs a punch."
Nik Brear (Sheffield Star) thought highly of the trio's performance at the Sheffield City Hall stating, "An incredible version of Relight My Fire closed a night where three incredible divas worked the stage from the second they stepped onto it. Each shone in their own right; no egos, not a competition – just a party."
Matthew Hemly (The Stage) enjoyed the performance at the HMV Hammersmith Apollo but was not pleased with veteran Chaka Kahn's performance saying, "Less impressive, sadly, is Chaka Khan, who seems to stumble over her words and forget lyrics, and who, on the whole, appears to be enjoying herself far less than her fellow performers."
Jade Wright (Liverpool Echo) gave the trio's performance at the Liverpool Philharmonic Hall eight out of ten stars stating, "The highlights were many – Lulu's fantastic voice was per fectly suited to Mercy, Chaka Khan's to Aretha Franklin's Respect and Anastacia's, unsurprisingly, to I'm Outta Love. Played out on a stunning split level illuminated stage, these were songs to live life by."
Edward Gleave (South Wales Evening Post) enjoyed the performance at the Cardiff International Arena remarking, "Seeing three polished performers all in the same show was a real treat. It really felt like it was three shows in one as each of the trio had their own musical style and fashion sense."
Mike Caulfield (City Life) gave the trio's performance at the Manchester Evening News Arena four out of five stars stating, "Anastasia managed to reach every corner of the arena with her soulful voice, while Lulu shows no sign of aging – particularly apparent on her passionate cover of Duffy's retro-sounding hit Mercy."
Aranda Rahbarkouhi (Evening Chronicle) was not impressed with the performance at the Metro Radio Arena stating, "Lulu's solo performance of Mercy had me praying for just that – and it was nothing to Shout about! It was torture and can only be described as watching a worn-out Miss Whiplash. Relight My Fire also turned into a bit of a damp squib for the diva. [..] If nothing else, these feisty females did remind me that a trip to the gym is long overdue. Either they work out or have discovered new bum-and- tum tuck pants."
Judi Killon (The News) enjoyed the performance at the Portsmouth Guildhall stating, "The evening proved a mix of old and new, including Mercy from Lulu, Amy Winehouse's Valerie from Heather, and a terrific I'm Outta Love from Anastasia. Although all of small stature, there were no timid voices here! A terrific celebration of sisterhood."

References

External links 
 
 
 

2009 concert tours
2010 concert tours
Anastacia concert tours
Co-headlining concert tours